Thung Khru is one of the 50 districts (khet) of Bangkok, Thailand. The district is bounded by (clockwise from north) Rat Burana District of Bangkok, Amphoe Phra Pradaeng and Amphoe Phra Samut Chedi of Samut Prakan province, Bang Khun Thian and Chom Thong of Bangkok.

Khet Thung Khru is a second-order administrative division. The district was established as Rat Burana. It became Khet Thung Khru in 1998. It was then moved back to Thonburi Province until Thonburi and Bangkok were merged. Thung Khru means 'the plain in the larger area'. "Thung" is a Thai word which means 'flat land' while "khru" has several meanings. It is thought that khru here stands for a kind of utensil woven and coated for water transport, hence an indication that the area was once famous for the handicraft. Thung Khru has two sub-districts (khwaeng), Bang Mot and Thung Khru. Although Buddhist temples in Thung Khru are not remarkable, with the possible exceptions of Wat Thung Khru, Wat Phutthabucha and Wat Bang Mot. Places of worship representing other religions are well represented.

Neighboring districts are (from the west clockwise) Thung Khru, Rat Burana, Yan Nawa, Khlong Toei, Phra Khanong, and Bang Na (all Bangkok), and the districts Mueang Samut Prakan and Phra Samut Chedi of Samut Prakan. It is at a large bend of the Chao Phraya River.

The Bang Mot tangerine is grown in the area.

Administration
The district is divided into two sub-districts (khwaeng).

Places
King Mongkut's University of Technology Thonburi (KMUTT);
Thon Buri Rom Park;
Thung kru Plaza;
Islamic College Thailand;
72nd Anniversary Stadium (Bang Mod);
Naluang School.

References

External links
 BMA website with landmarks of Thung Khru
 Thung Khru district office 
 King Mongkut's University of Technology Thonburi 

 
Districts of Bangkok